As She Left It is a novel written by Catriona McPherson and published by Midnight Ink Books (an imprint of Llewellyn Worldwide) on 8 June 2013, which later went on to win the Anthony Award for Best Paperback Original in 2014.

References 

Anthony Award-winning works
British mystery novels
2013 British novels
Scottish crime novels